Sindisiwe Mabogo (born 4 August 1998), is a South African singer-songwriter known professionally under the alias of LaSauce. She gained recognition after the release of "Phumelela" by Miss Pru DJ.

Mabogo grew in Durban, KwaZulu-Natal where she picked interest in music at an early age and got drawn to hip hop, R&B and jazz.

In 2017 when she was 18 years old, she got a recording deal with Ambitiouz Entertainment and released her debut single "I Do" with Amanda Black,<ref>{{Cite web |title=In Conversation with Amanda Black: 'I've grown incredibly from the girl who wrote 'Amazulu - OkayAfrica |url=https://www.okayafrica.com/amanda-black-speaks-amazulu-and-new-album-interview/ |access-date=2023-03-19 |website=www.okayafrica.com |language=en}}</ref> which surpassed million views on YouTube after 13 days of its music video release, and it also served as a lead single to her debut studio album Broken Lipstick.

 Awards and nominations 

 Discography 
 Broken Lipstick (2017)
 Sindisiwe'' (2020)

References

External links 

 

Living people
1998 births
South African women musicians
South African women singer-songwriters